Paphiopedilum concolor is a small terrestrial orchid first described in 1865 as Cypripedium concolor. Paphiopedilum concolor is native to southern China (Yunnan, Guizhou, Guangxi), Myanmar (Burma), Thailand and Southern and Central Vietnam, usually in Phong Nha-Kẻ Bàng National Park in Quảng Bình Province. They are generally found in lowlands, below  elevation, but have been found above .

Paphiopedilum concolor flowers in Spring and Autumn. These flowers come coloured in cream to peach, with dark red speckles. This orchid prefers a warm habitat and wet soil.

References

External links 
 
 

concolor
Orchids of Myanmar
Orchids of Thailand
Orchids of Vietnam
Orchids of Guizhou
Orchids of Yunnan
Flora of Guangxi
Plants described in 1865